Saigon Kick is an American hard rock band from Miami, Florida, that formed in 1988. When they recorded their debut album and second album the band consisted of lead vocalist Matt Kramer, lead guitarist Jason Bieler, bassist Tom Defile, and drummer Phil Varone. The modern lineup consists of Matt Kramer, Jason Bieler, bassist Chris McLernon, rhythm guitarist Steve Gibb, and drummer Jonathan Mover.

The band is mainly known for their second album The Lizard which reached number 80 on the Billboard 200, on the strength of its lead single "Love Is on the Way" which was a number 12 hit on the Billboard Hot 100, and is their only single to chart there. The album and "Love Is on the Way" have both been certified gold.

History

Formation and mainstream success (1988–1992)
The band was formed by lead vocalist Matt Kramer and guitarist Jason Bieler along with bassist Tom DeFile and drummer Phil Varone. They gained a following on the local club scene and generated enough of a buzz to be signed to Third Stone Records in 1990. Their self-titled debut album was released in 1991. The band toured extensively but the album only made a marginal showing on sales charts.

They went immediately back into the studio to record their second album, The Lizard which was released in 1992. The album spawned the band's only hit single on the Billboard Hot 100 in the US, "Love Is on the Way", which reached number 12. Just before touring for the album commenced, bassist Tom DeFile was fired. He was replaced by ex-Cold Sweat bassist Chris McLernon. In 1996, The Lizard, reached sales above 500,000 and was certified gold, their only album to achieve this certification.

Later years and breakup (1993–2000)
Looking to continue their momentum, the band quickly returned to Sweden to record their third album Water in 1993. During recording, Matt Kramer became disgruntled with the direction that the band was heading both musically and stylistically. Kramer also argued that there were financial disputes within the band and tensions reached a boiling point. He officially left the band mid-session and returned to Florida. With Kramer gone, Bieler decided to take over all of the vocal duties in addition to playing guitar on the album. Finishing touches were added to the album at sessions in Tampa, Florida. Guitarist Pete Dembrowski was hired in time for the band's 1993 tour to support the new album. Water sold significantly less than the previous album, and Atlantic decided to drop the band in 1994.

The band signed to the CMC International label in 1995, and the lineup of Bieler, McLernon, Varone, and Dembrowski released their fourth album Devil in the Details that same year. Saigon Kick then toured globally, particularly in South East Asia, but they never managed to build on the success of The Lizard in the US.

In July 1997, the band attempted a reunion with Matt Kramer on lead vocals. Phil Varone had already left the band and was replaced by drummer Ricky Sanders. This became the first five piece version of the band, consisting of Kramer, Bieler, McLernon, Dembrowski and Sanders. A new song was recorded called "Dizzy's Vine" which was released on Moments from the Fringe, a compilation album of demos and rare tracks. This lineup was quite short lived, with Bieler leaving after two live shows in Florida, effectively ending the reunion.

Bieler, Dembrowski, and Sanders recorded the final Saigon Kick studio album, Bastards for release in the Far East in 1999. The three then decided to retire the Saigon Kick name and reorganize as Super TransAtlantic.

In 2000, original members Kramer, Varone, and DeFile resurrected the Saigon Kick name for a short tour. Jason Bieler, being involved with Super TransAtlantic and wanting no part of a reunion, was replaced by DeFile's former Left For Dead bandmate Jeff Blando on guitar. After the tour, the members scattered and Saigon Kick were considered finished.

Post-breakup (2001–2011)
Bieler, Dembrowski, and Sanders, along with bassist Pat Badger of Extreme, formed Super TransAtlantic and released the band's only album Shuttlecock in 2000. They also appear on the soundtrack to the film American Pie with the song "Super Down".

Matt Kramer released his debut solo album titled War & Peas on September 11, 2002 through Lascivious Records. He also published his debut book of poetry, An American Profit, on October 31, 2007 through Lascivious Books.

Phil Varone joined Skid Row bassist Rachel Bolan's side project Prunella Scales in 1997 and recorded their album Dressing Up the Idiot. He then joined Skid Row in 2000 and can be heard on the band's album Thickskin. Varone left Skid Row in 2003, citing his ongoing battle with cocaine addiction and his need to turn his life around. Afterwards, he began promoting his movie Waking up Dead in which a film crew chronicled several years of his life as a rock star, and the behind the scenes ups and downs that come with it. His focus is no longer primarily music, and up until the summer of 2010, he was booking and hosting stand-up comedy shows in Los Angeles. In 2010, Varone moved to Las Vegas and directed a video series for pornography studio Vivid Entertainment. He also has a signature adult toy line released by California Exotics Novelties.

Chris McLernon and Ricky Sanders teamed up to form Two Heads Music, working in television, film and advertising music production.

Jason Bieler and his brother Aaron now own a recording studio and record label in South Florida called Bieler Bros. Records.

Ricky Sanders was subsequently the touring drummer for former Bad Company lead singer Brian Howe.

Beginning in 2011, Jason Bieler began a new studio-only project named Owl Stretching. It is an ongoing project with songs available for download on Bandcamp and iTunes.

Reunion (2012–present)
On 21 September 2012, via the official Saigon Kick page on Facebook, the following message was posted:
"Saigon Kick will be reuniting with all of the original members Matt Kramer, Phil Varone, Jason Bieler, Tom Defile and Chris McLernon. Dates to be announced shortly." The band has discussed the possibility of new material.

On 25 February 2013, via the official Saigon Kick page on Facebook, they announced that Tom Defile was no longer involved with the reunion in a statement that read "After the official Saigon Kick reunion announcement and rehearsals, we regret to announce that Tom Defile will not be continuing with the band. Tom and Saigon Kick amicably decided this is best for both parties and we wish him nothing but success in his future endeavors."

A string of concerts were played in March / April 2013 in Orlando, Ft. Lauderdale, St. Petersburg, Las Vegas, Los Angeles, and New York City. An additional pair of shows were announced for December 2014 - in Las Vegas and St. Petersburg. These shows are significant in the band's history as they saw the return of original bassist Tom Defile to stand in for Chris McLernon. The Las Vegas concert was the first performance by all four of Saigon Kick's original members in 22 years.

On May 12, 2015, the band announced that drummer Phil Varone was leaving the group, and would be replaced by Jonathan Mover for the band's scheduled 2015 live dates. Three days later, bassist Chris McLernon had announced that he was leaving the band.

Musical style
Saigon Kick's music is a fusion of glam metal, alternative, grunge, heavy metal, and hard rock.

Band members

Current members
 Matt Kramer – lead vocals 
 Jason Bieler – lead guitar, vocals 
 Chris McLernon - bass 
 Steve Gibb - rhythm guitar 
 Jonathan Mover – drums

Former members
 Phil Varone – drums 
 Tom Defile – bass 
 Pete Dembrowski – guitar 
 Ricky Sanders – drums

Past live members
 Jeff Blando – lead guitar 
 Atom Ellis - bass

Timeline

Discography

Albums

Singles

See also
 List of glam metal bands and artists

References

External links
 Official Website
 Matt Kramer
 Bieler Brothers Records
 Phil Varone
 Chris McLernon.com

CMC International artists
Glam metal musical groups from Florida
Hard rock musical groups from Florida
Heavy metal musical groups from Florida
Musical groups established in 1988
Musical groups disestablished in 2000
Musical groups reestablished in 2012
Musical groups from Coral Springs, Florida